The term ethnic Mennonite refers to Mennonites of Central European ancestry and culture who are considered to be members of a Mennonite ethnic or ethnoreligious group. The term is also used for aspects of their culture, such as language, dress, and Mennonite food.

History
The most prominent ethnic Mennonite groups are Russian Mennonites (German: Russland-Mennoniten), who formed as an ethnic group in Prussia and South Russia (now Ukraine), but who are of Dutch (both Flemish and Frisian) ancestry and speak Plautdietsch and Mennonites of Pennsylvania Dutch heritage who formed as an ethnic group in North America and who are of Swiss-German and German ancestry.

Because Mennonites for centuries almost only married inside their churches, they developed into ethnic groups in Russia since 1789 and in North America since the 1730s, where for a long time almost all of them kept their ethno-languages Pennsylvania German and Plautdietsch.

Until the middle of the 1950s the vast majority of Mennonites were of Central European or Eastern European ancestry and culture, all the same if they were conservative or modern and all the same if they lived in Europe, North America, Mexico, Paraguay or in Brazil. Since then, missionary activities of Mennonites led to so many converts in Africa, India, Indonesia and other places outside Europe and North America that, in 2012, a majority of Mennonites are not of Central European or Eastern European heritage anymore.

Some conservative strains of Mennonites, like the Old Order Mennonites and the Old Colony Mennonites have kept their languages, traditional customs and the practice of endogamy until today, so that they are considered to be ethnic or ethnoreligious groups. The same is true for the Hutterites and the Amish who are Anabaptists like the Mennonites, but have never engaged in mission activities on a larger scale.

Due to the fact that most Mennonites today do not belong to either of these ethnic group, some discussions have arisen around the continued use of the term "ethnic Mennonite".

Literature 
 Francis, E. K.: The Russian Mennonites: From Religious to Ethnic Group in American Journal of Sociology Vol. 54, No. 2 (Sep., 1948), pp. 101–107. 
 Loewen, Royden: The Poetics of Peoplehood: Ethnicity and Religion among Canada's Mennonites in Paul Bramadat, David Seljak: Christianity and Ethnicity in Canada, 2008.
 Redekop, John H.: A People Apart: Ethnicity and the Mennonite Brethren, 1987.

References 

Mennonitism
German-American history
German-American culture
Ethnoreligious groups in the United States
Swiss-American history